Khoirul Huda (born June 25, 1989) is an Indonesian footballer that currently plays for Sriwijaya in the Indonesia Super League.

Honours

Club honors
Sriwijaya
Indonesia Super League (1): 2011–12
Indonesian Inter Island Cup (1): 2012

References

External links

1989 births
Association football midfielders
Living people
Indonesian footballers
Liga 1 (Indonesia) players
Sriwijaya F.C. players